Peniuto Semisi is a Tokelauan politician and former member of the Parliament of Tokelau.

References

Members of the Parliament of Tokelau
Living people
Year of birth missing (living people)
Place of birth missing (living people)